Junius Silanus may refer to:

 Appius Junius Silanus, Roman senator, executed by the emperor Claudius
 Gaius Junius Silanus, Roman senator, convicted of treason under the emperor Tiberius
 Decimus Junius Silanus (disambiguation)
 Lucius Junius Silanus
 Marcus Junius Silanus (disambiguation)

See also

 
 Junii Silani